Nishihara (written: 西原) is a Japanese surname. Notable people with the surname include:

Clarence K. Nishihara, American politician
, Japanese film director, screenwriter, producer and actor
, Japanese chemist
, Japanese long-distance runner
, Japanese voice actress
, Japanese footballer

See also
Nishihara, Okinawa, town in Nakagami District, Okinawa, Japan
Nishihara, Kumamoto, village in Aso District, Kumamoto, Japan
Nishihara Station, Astram Line station in Hiroshima, Japan
Nishihara Loans, series of loans made by the Empire of Japan

Japanese-language surnames